Jan-Dirk "Dick" Schreuder (born 12 August 1971) is a Dutch professional football manager and former player who is the head coach of Keuken Kampioen Divisie club PEC Zwolle. He formerly played for PSV, Sparta Rotterdam, Groningen, RKC Waalwijk, Helmond Sport, Go Ahead Eagles and Stoke City.

His brother Alfred was also a footballer.

Playing career
Schreuder was born in Barneveld and began his career with PSV Eindhoven. He played four times for PSV.

He then played a season at Sparta Rotterdam and Groningen before finding regular football with RKC Waalwijk.

He left the Netherlands in the summer of 1997 on a bosman and signed for English side Stoke City. His move to English football did not got according to plan and he made just two appearances for Stoke both coming as a substitute in the League Cup in 1997–98.

He returned to Dutch football with Helmond Sport. He ended his professional career with Go Ahead Eagles.

Coaching career
Schreuder joined Dutch amateur club SDV Barneveld in 2007. He managed them to promotion in the 2012–13 season, forging a reputation for bringing young players through and playing attractive football.

In June 2013, he joined Barnet as head of coaching, with the three most senior coaching positions at the club all being taken up by Dutchmen: Schreuder, Edgar Davids and Ulrich Landvreugd. After the departure of Davids in January 2014, Schreuder and Landvreugd were appointed joint managers. The duo lost their jobs to Martin Allen on 19 March after four straight losses, and returned to a first team coaching role.

Schreuder left Barnet to become manager of VV Katwijk in May 2014.

In February 2018 he joined the technical staff of Philadelphia Union. and was replaced in Katwijk by Jack van den Berg. On 27 May 2019 Philadelphia Union announced, that Schreuder would leave the club at the end of the season to become assistant manager of TSG 1899 Hoffenheim for the 2019–20 season. On 12 June 2021, it was announced that Schreuder would become assistant coach to Thomas Letsch at Vitesse, where he signed a contract until 30 June 2023.

On 18 November 2021, Schreuder signed a one-and-a-half year deal to become the new PEC Zwolle head coach, replacing the outgoing Art Langeler.

Career statistics
Source:

References

External links
 Dick Schreuder profile at Voetbal International

1971 births
Living people
People from Barneveld
Footballers from Gelderland
Dutch footballers
Netherlands youth international footballers
Dutch football managers
Dutch expatriate footballers
Expatriate footballers in England
Dutch expatriate sportspeople in England
PSV Eindhoven players
Stoke City F.C. players
Sparta Rotterdam players
FC Groningen players
RKC Waalwijk players
Helmond Sport players
Go Ahead Eagles players
Barnet F.C. non-playing staff
Barnet F.C. managers
Philadelphia Union non-playing staff
SBV Vitesse non-playing staff
PEC Zwolle managers
National League (English football) managers
Eredivisie players
Eerste Divisie players
Eredivisie managers
Association football midfielders
VV Katwijk managers